Miss Sahhara (stylized as Miss saHHara, pronounced Sahara), is a British Nigerian beauty queen, fashion model, singer-songwriter, trans woman and human rights advocate. She is known for representing Nigeria in international beauty pageants to draw attention to the plights of LGBTQI+ people in Africa. In 2011, she became the first Nigerian trans woman to come out publicly in international press during the Miss International Queen beauty pageant in Pattaya, Thailand. On 19 July 2014, she was crowned the first-ever Super Sireyna Worldwide in Manila, Philippines, making her the first black trans woman to be crowned winner in an international beauty competition. After winning Super Sireyna Worldwide, she founded a global transgender awareness news curation organisation called TransValid. She is also a vocal critic of the 14-year imprisonment law for LGBTQI+ people in Nigeria.

Self-described as a "fashion and beauty enthusiast", her catwalk and print credentials range from fashion weeks to posing for covers of magazines internationally.

Biography
Miss saHHara has stated that she didn't feel like she fit into the religious and conservative views of Nigeria while growing up. Living in rural Nigeria made her unaware of her medical condition, gender dysphoria. 

Following stigmatisation from her community, she attempted suicide twice and survived. 

She  imprisoned as a teenager because of her femininity, accused of being "gay" when .

Emigration to United Kingdom 
To escape from persecution in Nigeria, she emigrated in 2004 to the United Kingdom. 

Miss saHHara graduated with a Master's degree in digital media from London Metropolitan University in 2011. 

She got a singing residence at Madam Jojo's Kitsch Cabaret in Soho, West End of London. She performed there for 10 years until November 2014 when the venue was closed down.

She wrote and co-produced songs with Scott Houzet early in her music career.

Fashion model 
She has appeared in catwalk shows in London, including modelling for Ziad Ghanem at London Fashion Week for 4 fashion seasons.

She was also involved with Alternative Fashion for over 5 years and once showcased her couture designs.

Dead name 
Nigerian news websites and bloggers have frequently referenced a tweet by Ebuka Obi-Uchendu, in which he claimed to have known Miss saHHara under her former male name. Miss saHHara refuted the claim and has refused to publish her full birth name, insisting that her old name and appearance have no relevance to whom she has become.

Conflict with bloggers and readers 
She is known for online conflicts with Nigerian bloggers. Most of her arguments with them range from disputing stories they published about her to accusing their writing of being transphobic by, for example, calling her a "transgender man" and refusing to use female pronouns to describe her.

Miss saHHara has also drawn criticism by calling religion oppressive and archaic.

Beauty pageants 
Miss saHHara's pageant career began when she was a contestant in Andrew Logan's Alternative Miss World when she first moved to London in 2004, representing Nigeria. She came second.

In 2011, she was a contestant at Miss International Queen beauty pageant, representing Nigeria. During the pageant she came out to the world media as a Nigerian transgender woman.

In 2014, she won her first international title, Eat Bulaga!'s Super Sireyna Worldwide 2014 in Manila, Philippines. The pageant is a prestigious transgender beauty contest, which takes place on the longest noontime television show in the world, Eat Bulaga! In the competition, she represented her birth country Nigeria to draw attention to the negative social and legal attitudes towards the LGBTQI+ community in Africa.

She was crowned in front of millions of viewers watching worldwide by Miss Universe 1973, Margarita Moran-Floirendo.

She is the founder and executive producer of Miss Trans Global, a transgender advocacy pageant, started in 2020 to raise awareness for the plight of LGBTIQ people worldwide. The first edition of the competition took place virtually on 12 September 2020.

Charity and advocacy work 
Miss saHHara started a global awareness project for the transgender community called TransValid in 2014. According to the mission statement of the organisation, they hope to "tackle misconceptions, fear, and hate of transgender people worldwide."

In August 2015, Miss saHHara produced a short film for TransValid titled The Deadly Price of Transphobia in Brazil. The film highlighted the hardship and danger of living in Brazil as a transgender woman.

On 31 March 2016, International Transgender Day of Visibility, she partnered with Aleika Barros, Miss Trans Universe 2015, and other transgender beauty queens to raise awareness for transgender community all around the world through a campaign titled 'I am Trans and I have the Right to Life' .

Television appearances 
 2 episodes of 'Lady Boys: Season 2 on Sky Living, exploring the lives of transgender women in Thailand and beyond.
 Eat Bulaga!'s Super Sireyna Worldwide on GMA Network
 Unang Hirit Morning show
 Tunay Na Buhay interviewed by Rhea Santos
 Mars
 BBC's in Her Shoes: #BBCIdentity

Pageant titles

References/notes

External links
 Miss saHHara's Official Website
 Tranvalid Organisation

21st-century Nigerian women singers
Nigerian emigrants to the United Kingdom
Transgender female models
Transgender actresses
British activists
British women activists
Nigerian women activists
Transgender rights activists
Living people
Nigerian female models
British LGBT rights activists
Nigerian LGBT rights activists
Year of birth missing (living people)
Nigerian LGBT people
Transgender women
Women civil rights activists